John Thomas Dunn may refer to:

John T. Dunn (1838–1907), American politician
John Thomas Dunn (chemist) (1858–1939), English chemist

See also
 John Dunn (disambiguation)